Thomas Edmond Jeffs (3 August 1900–1971) was an English footballer who played in the Football League for Northampton Town.

References

1900 births
1971 deaths
English footballers
Association football defenders
English Football League players
Northampton Town F.C. players